Catherine Eva Hughes  (née Pestell; 24 September 1933 – 10 December 2014) was a British diplomat and academic administrator. She served as Principal of Somerville College, Oxford, from 1989 to 1996.

Early life and education
Hughes was born on 24 September 1933 in County Durham, England, to Edmund Pestell and his wife Isabelle Pestell (née Sangster). Having won a scholarship, she was educated at Leeds Girls' High School, a selective private school in Leeds. She then studied history at St Hilda's College, Oxford, and graduated with a Bachelor of Arts (BA) degree.

Diplomatic career
Two of her history tutors recognised her academic excellence, encouraged her to apply for St Hilda's, Oxford, a women-only college, in 1952. She passed the civil service with flying colours, and was asked to enter the diplomatic corps.  The Foreign Office mandarins were entirely male during her first posting in London. Hughes was sent to The Hague. From there she spent three and a half years in Bangkok, as Second Secretary, during decolonisation and a rising tide of communism in south-east Asia. After another stint in London, this time for five years, she was made First Secretary for the prestigious Organisation for Economic Co-operation and Development (OECD) in Paris.

She was asked in 1975 to take the tough role of negotiator in East Berlin missions in a divided city during the Cold War détente, having as a visiting fellow to St Anthony's already established an international reputation.  Colleagues apparently recalled her good sense of humour, as absurdist.  In an existential world of hardship and political paranoia she remained "cantankerous".  During the 1980s she had a three-year posting to Bonn (West Germany) speaking several foreign languages. Recalled to London, she served as assistant undersecretary of state at the Foreign Office for two years.

Oxford University
Having graduated with a first class degree in History from Oxford, Hughes returned on being elected as a visiting Fellow of St Anthony's. She was appointed as Principal of Somerville College in 1989, at the height of Thatcherism.  Next to Somerville was Green College, a new foundation.  In 1991, she married the acting Warden of Green College, Dr Trevor Hughes. The fellows of Somerville, who included the Prime Minister, were strongly opposed to any dilution of the last bastion of femininity at the most ancient university in the British Isles. Hughes believed her management style was more primus inter pares than the Cabinet's. Men were finally admitted to Somerville in 1994 and Hughes retired two years later.

Later life and death
On retirement with her husband, Hughes remained in close contact with Oxford.  She was a member of St Frideswide's Book Club, named after the Oxford martyr. Founded by Sir Roger Bannister, Hughes was an early member of an elite set.  Suffering from cancer, which was borne with courage she travelled, enjoying cruises. In 2014 she established the Rhabanus Maurus Travel Grant.

Hughes died on 10 December 2014.

Dr Alice Prochaska, who was then Somerville College Principal, and one of her successors, paid a glowing tribute

This is a very sad time for the whole College. Catherine Hughes was an insightful, effective and much respected Principal.  She was kind and considerate to all her colleagues, and much concerned with the intellectual development and well-being of the students. She and her husband, Trevor Hughes's wonderfully generosity to Somerville on behalf of students and Fellows has made a significant difference. At this time, we remember above all a much-loved and very distinguished Principal, who held Somerville close to her heart.

References

1933 births
2014 deaths
Civil servants in the Cabinet Office
Members of HM Diplomatic Service
Principals of Somerville College, Oxford
People from County Durham
People educated at Leeds Girls' High School
Alumni of St Hilda's College, Oxford
Fellows of Somerville College, Oxford
Companions of the Order of St Michael and St George